The Long-Sault Bridge is a bridge connecting Hawkesbury, Ontario and Grenville, Quebec. It crosses the Ottawa River via Chenail Island. It connects Quebec Route 344 and Ontario Highway 34. 

The bridge was built and completed in 1998 to replace the original Perley Bridge built in 1931 (and which was demolished in 1999).

See also 
 List of crossings of the Ottawa River

References

Road bridges in Ontario
Road bridges in Quebec
Bridges completed in 1998
Bridges over the Ottawa River
Transport in Laurentides
Buildings and structures in Laurentides
Hawkesbury, Ontario